Banham Conversions (Banmoco) was a coachbuilder and manufacturer of kit cars from the late 1970s until 2004. The company, based in Rochester, Kent, was founded by Paul Banham who started off as a coachbuilder converting vehicles into convertibles. He made convertible versions of the Ferrari 400, Aston Martin DBS and V8, and the Rolls-Royce Corniche.

In the 1990s the company moved on to selling conversion kits to the general public to convert common vehicles into something more sporty. These were mainly based on British cars, such as the Austin Mini, Austin/Rover Metro, Jaguar models and the Austin Maestro. But the company gained fame for producing Porsche replicas.

Kits were sold up to the mid-2000s, when the Banham Conversions ceased production of all kit cars.

Paul Banham didn't leave the car industry because later in 2007 he produced a kit replica of the Jaguar XK180 prototype under a separate company and then went on to restore & create new classic wood rim steering wheels under his Myrtle LTD company.

Vehicles

Banham XJ-SS 

From 1994 Banham conversions was marketing a coachbuilt service to rebody the Jaguar XJS into a more modern and slender shape using Vauxhall corsa headlights and Ford Mondeo rear lights, they called it the XJ-SS. In 1996 the company moved into offering "kits" for the first time now selling the full GRP body kit to fit and paint at home.

Banham 130 Spyder 

The Banham Spyder was based on the Skoda Estelle and Skoda Rapid and a very close replica of the Porsche 550 of James Dean fame. These were very popular because rear engined Skoda models were very cheap and easy to find. These replicas have become very collectable since original Porsche 550s are very expensive.

Banham 200 

Paul Banham managed to buy a set of factory body panel moulds for the Ford RS200, from this he discovered the humble Austin Maestro shared the same wheelbase with the legendary rally car, from this he built a dimensionally correct replica of the RS200. The donor cars he suggested was the MG Maestro 2.0 or Turbo model, with the turbo model it gave a 0 to 60 time under 6 seconds. At the time the car was criticized for been front-engined and front wheel drive when the original RS200 was mid-engined and four wheel drive but car journalists at the time found it fun to drive and cheap to build because of the Maestro donor car.

Banham X99 

The X99 was previewed to public in march 1999 in various kit car magazines and released shortly after to great acclaim by reviewers and journalists at the time who loved the styling, the range options and the low price of the kit with the basic coupe package only costing £1395.

The design was said to have a striking resemblance to the concept drawings to the Audi TT especially in fixed head coupe form but other models of the X99 were released by November including a full convertible with retractable canvas hood and a GRP two-piece targa with a removal-able roof.

The X99 was built by using any model of Austin or Rover Metro, removing the roof and other bodywork, adding stiffeners and then fitting the replacement GRP bodyshell. Sales were very good with over 300 kits sold in the first six months of 1999 but by 2000 VAG got involved and threatened legal action over the design.

Banham X21 

The X21 was shown to the public for the first time by Banham Conversions own website on the 1/1/2000, even boasting it was the first car "the first car of the new Millennium".

This was merely a X99 with slightly altered styling to appease VAG from taking legal action against the company, the styling changes weren't major and was mainly a different front grill, slightly different wheel arches and circular VW Lupo headlights and different tail lights. To save costs the X21 was pushed as a convertible only model, for people who wanted a coupe a GRP hard top was made and a modified two-piece targa top was also available.

In 2003 customers were still asking for a "proper" coupe and because of this demand a X21 coupe using the existing X99 moulds with new lights and other details was produced, this car was named the X21 GT.

The X21 was just as popular as the X99 kit as the hype built for the Audi TT to reach production, the X99 and X21 were seen as a cheap and affordable kit car to have some of the styling of the TT on a budget.

Banham Superbug 

Paul Banham by mid 1999 had the newly launched X99 kit which was selling well but with its separate GRP doors and other extras that needed plenty of work it was considered by some as a labour intensive build to make to a professional standard, it also needed painting to make a finished car. So from this Paul wanted to make a kit incredibly easy to build by anyone, the perfect "starter kit", so for this he created a design of a small car with no doors, no roof, no rear window and no complication in build. The styling shared some of the nose design of the X99 with different headlights, two slashes down the sides where driver and passenger would side in but left two small rear seats for passengers, he also gave it a rounded rear end using the new VW Beetle tail lamps, he named this design the SB2000 but debuted it the Superbug.

Paul Banham said it to be a modern version of the Mini Moke or beach buggy. Again the car was based around any model of Rover Metro but this time the bracing was more basic  and as the design had no opening doors, this meant the kit could be sold at a more affordable price, Bodyshells also came in gelcoat colours too for the first time so it didn't need to be painted again saving the customer money. A basic roof frame and roof with zip in sides similar to a bond bug were made for some weather proofing too.

The basic starter Kit for the superbug started as little as £995 but for all the extras to finish the car it would cost £1495, in 2000 this was the cheapest kit car on sale and it sold very well for the four years it was on sale for.

The new speedster 

The previous model the Banham Spyder was nick named "the speedster" and in the late 90s Paul Banham wanted to make another Porsche kit, this was "the new speedster", this kit was inspired by the Porsche 356 but had slightly different styling and a shorter wheelbase to an original 356. This again was based on the Metro range of cars.

Banham Bat 

One of Paul Banham's final metro kits was the Banham Bat, this used very modern styling which at the time was compared to the batmobile from batman but also looked like a smaller Bugatti Veyron with a large central upright front grill.

Two models were offered, both were fixed head coupes but one came with a removable roof panel.

It was launched in early 2002 and at its first showing at the national kit car show it sold 21 one kits to Paul Banham said sales of the kit slowed after. Many journalists at the time said it had "love or hate" styling and people preferred the curvier styling of the x21 and superbug models.

Banham Sprint 

By far one of the most popular kits offered by Banham was the sprint, this was a close replica to the original Austin frogeye Sprite. The whole vehicle was based around the mechanicals of a Austin Mini making it front wheel drive not rear wheel drive like the original, the bodyshell was GRP and had a small bootlid again unlike the original but helped access the boot.

Banham mini roadster 

Paul Banham's final design was from his coachbuilding roots, he decided to convert a classic Austin Mini into a two-seater convertible. The prototype was shown to the public in 2001 and used blended GRP panels and roll over hoops for the roadster styling.

Unlike the previous Banham cars this was a coachbuilt service so donor vehicles would be taken to the Banham factory to be converted rather than a kit for owners to do the work themselves.

Banham 120 

One of the last designs advertised by Paul Banham conversions was a replica of the Jaguar XK120 convertible, this was a not sold as a kit was a coachbuilt vehicle to order at the Paul Banham factory. It was built using 1990s BMW parts but looked like an original XK120.

Ending of production 

By 1998 much of the kit car market had fallen after the introduction of the SVA test, the SVA was introduced by the British Government to regulate the kit car industry and regulate the quality of kits produced for and by customers before they could take to the road, the SVA was very strict compared to previous kit cars only needing to pass a MOT and cost up to £450, without passing a SVA test you couldn't register your car to drive it legally on the road.

Banham Conversions kit car models avoided all this as the kits were considered bodyshell conversions which avoided the need for a SVA test but the DVLA caused problems as it was mentioned in a 2003 issue of "which kit? magazine" that some DVLA officers were not allowing owners of Banham kits to register their vehicles without a SVA test first while other DVLA officers were allowing them to be registered without, this lasted until 2004 when VOSA/DVLA decided the modifications needed to create a Banaham kit car was more than a bodyshell swap and needed a SVA, all kits were discontinued after the company was sold to Rally Sport Replicas LTD who sought to create a new design of chassis for the previous models but they ceased trading in early 2005 after little was achieved and no kits sold.

The New Speedster design was excluded from the sale because the design and tooling were was sold to 356 Sports during 2006 which also ceased trading shortly after.

References

External links 
 Bat Building
 Banham 200 Forums
 Banham X21
 Banham Spyder Builders group 
 Banham Sprint owners group

Defunct motor vehicle manufacturers of England
Kit car manufacturers
Defunct companies based in Kent